A feint is a manoeuvre designed to distract or mislead, particularly in swordsmanship, warfare and combat sports.

Feint may also refer to:
 "Feint" (song), by Epica (2003)
 Feint-ruled paper
 Adrian Feint (1894-1971), Australian artist

See also
 Aurora Feint, a video game series
 Faint (disambiguation)
 OpenFeint, a social platform for mobile games